Khanom Tokyo or Khanom Tokiao is a Thai street snack. It is a thin flat pancake filled with sweet custard cream. Some have a savory filling, like pork or sausage.

History 
The snack is believed to have been sold for the first time in 1967 at a Japanese department store in Bangkok, named Thai-Daimaru (タイ大丸), and is said to be a Thai adaptation of the Japanese dorayaki.

The snack can have either sweet or savoury fillings. In the Thai language, khanom means "snack" or "sweet". The name Tokyo is taken from the capital of Japan.  Although the name of this snack suggests a Japanese origin, in reality this is a Thai invention.

Ingredients 
The batter is made from egg, wheat flour, sugar, fresh milk, baking soda. The fillings are usually sweet: vanilla cream, taro, pandan cream, various fruit jams, shredded coconut, cocoa powder etc. Often fillings are kind of sweet but always mixed with something salty such as quail eggs or small sausages.

References

External links
 

Street food
Thai desserts and snacks
Stuffed dishes